Albinaria latelamellaris is a species of air-breathing land snail, a terrestrial pulmonate gastropod mollusk in the family Clausiliidae, the door snails.

Distribution 
This species occurs in:
 Turkey

References

External links 
 http://www.animalbase.uni-goettingen.de/zooweb/servlet/AnimalBase/home/species?id=2334

Albinaria
Gastropods described in 2000
Endemic fauna of Turkey